Michael Brown (born August 3, 1973), professionally known as Michael Ealy, is an American  actor. He is known for his roles in Barbershop (2002), 2 Fast 2 Furious (2003), Takers (2010), Think Like a Man (2012),  About Last Night (2014), Think Like a Man Too (2014), The Perfect Guy (2015), and The Intruder (2019). He has a number of starring and recurring roles on numerous of television sitcoms.

Early life
Ealy was born in Washington, D.C., and was raised in Silver Spring, Maryland. Ealy went to Springbrook High School and graduated from the University of Maryland in College Park, Maryland with a degree in English. His mother worked for IBM and his father was in the grocery business.

Career
He started his acting career in the late 1990s, appearing in several off-Broadway stage productions. Among his first film roles were Bad Company and Kissing Jessica Stein. His breakout role came in 2002's Barbershop, in which he plays reformed felon Ricky Nash, a role that he reprised in the 2004 sequel, Barbershop 2: Back in Business. In 2003, he played the role of Slap Jack in the second installment of the Fast and the Furious film series, 2 Fast 2 Furious. Later in 2004, Ealy appeared in Never Die Alone with DMX. He also appeared in Mariah Carey's music video for her hit single "Get Your Number" from her 2005 album The Emancipation of Mimi.

In 2005, Ealy co-starred in the Television film version of Their Eyes Were Watching God, produced by Oprah Winfrey and Quincy Jones, and starring Academy Award-winning actress Halle Berry. The same year, he starred in the independent film Jellysmoke, directed by Mark Banning. He starred in the Showtime television series Sleeper Cell, the first season of which aired December 4–18, 2005, and the second season of which, Sleeper Cell: American Terror, aired December 10–17, 2006.

On December 14, 2006, Ealy was nominated for a Golden Globe Award for his role in Sleeper Cell: American Terror in the category Best Performance by an Actor in a Mini-Series or Motion Picture Made for Television. In December 2008 he was featured in the movie Seven Pounds alongside Will Smith as Ben Thomas. He also starred as the male lead in Beyoncé's "Halo" music video, and as CIA Field Officer Marshall Vogel in the ABC television series FlashForward.

Ealy also appears in the limited-edition coffee table book (About Face) by celebrity photographer John Russo, published by Pixie Press Worldwide. In 2009, Ealy performed in The People Speak, a documentary feature film that uses dramatic and musical performances of the letters, diaries, and speeches of everyday Americans, based on historian Howard Zinn's A People's History of the United States.

In 2010, Ealy appeared as attorney Derrick Bond in the second season of The Good Wife.  He co-starred in the 2010 action movie Takers as Jake Attica and appeared as Travis Marks in USA Network's original series Common Law about two cops who have to go to couples counseling because they argue too much. Common Law premiered following Fairly Legal on Friday, May 11, 2012.

Ealy appeared as Dominic in the 2012 ensemble comedy Think Like a Man and its 2014 sequel, Think Like a Man Too, and appeared as "Papa Joe" in the 2012 inspirational film Unconditional. He appeared opposite Think Like a Man co-star Kevin Hart in the 2014 remake of About Last Night.

In 2013, Ealy signed on to play co-lead "Dorian" in the Fox television series Almost Human. The sci-fi police procedural takes place in the year 2048 and follows the relationship between two cops as they struggle to solve futuristic crimes that involve complex technology. Ealy depicts the android "Dorian", an older, "DRN" android model that is considered to be less reliable due to its artificial emotions and that is tasked with protecting his partner John Kennex (Karl Urban). The show aired for one season on Fox from 2013 to 2014.

In 2015, Ealy played serial killer "Theo" in season 3 of the Fox television series The Following. He starred as Eric Warner in the second season of the ABC mystery crime series Secrets and Lies, which aired in the fall of 2016. From 2017 to 2019 Ealy starred in the fourth and fifth and final season of Being Mary Jane opposite Gabrielle Union. 2019 also saw Ealy star in Stumptown on ABC alongside Cobie Smulders, Jake Johnson and Camryn Manheim

Personal life
In October 2012, Ealy married Afghan entrepreneur Khatira Rafiqzada, his girlfriend of four years, in a ceremony in Los Angeles, and together they have a son and a daughter.

Ealy is a fan of the Washington Commanders.

Filmography

Film

Television

Music videos

Awards and nominations

References

External links

 
 

20th-century American male actors
21st-century American male actors
1973 births
African-American male actors
American male film actors
American male television actors
American male voice actors
Living people
Male actors from Maryland
Male actors from Washington, D.C.
People from Silver Spring, Maryland
University of Maryland, College Park alumni
20th-century African-American people
21st-century African-American people